Mayiandit County ( Haak County) is a county in Unity State, South Sudan. Before the reorganisation of states in 2015, it was a part of Unity State. Inhabitant by Haak Nuer people  of Unity state Bentiu.

References

Counties of South Sudan
Unity (state)